Rosalind Marie Knight (3 December 1933 – 19 December 2020) was an English actress. Her career spanned 70 years on stage, screen, and television. Her film appearances include Blue Murder at St Trinian's (1957), Carry On Nurse (1959), Carry On Teacher (1959), Tom Jones (1963), and About a Boy (2002). Among her TV roles were playing Beryl in the BBC sitcom Gimme Gimme Gimme (1999–2001) and Cynthia Goodman aka "Horrible Grandma" in Friday Night Dinner (2012, 2016–2020).

Career
Knight was born in Marylebone, London. She was the daughter of actor Esmond Knight and his first wife, Frances Clare, and the stepdaughter of actress Nora Swinburne. Being from a theatrical family, she was introduced to theatre at an early age. She was inspired by a visit to the bombed-out Old Vic Theatre in 1949 with her father to see performances of The Snow Queen and As You Like It. After studying there for two years under Glen Byam Shaw and George Devine, she was offered a position as Assistant Stage Manager at the Midland Theatre Company in Coventry. From Coventry, she moved to Ipswich Repertory Company, where Joe Orton was a fellow ASM.

Two years later, she joined a touring group, the West of England Theatre Company, for an eight-month stint. She was spotted by a producer, which led to her being cast as a schoolgirl in Blue Murder at St Trinian's (1957). That same year, she starred with her father, playing father and daughter, in the BBC production of Nicholas Nickleby. An earlier film role, albeit uncredited, was as a lady-in-waiting in Laurence Olivier's film Richard III (1955), which also featured her father.

In the late 1950s, Knight appeared in the BBC Radio comedy series Ray's a Laugh. During this period, she also performed in two early Carry On films. In Carry On Nurse (1959), she played Nurse Nightingale and in Carry On Teacher (also 1959), she played Felicity Wheeler, a prim school inspector whose amorous hopes toward Kenneth Connor's wimpy science master are continually thwarted. In 1963, she played Mrs Fitzpatrick in the film of Tom Jones and was in a second St Trinian's film, playing a teacher in The Wildcats of St Trinian's in 1980.

She made numerous appearances on television, in shows such as Coronation Street (1981), Sherlock Holmes (1984), Mapp & Lucia (1985), Only Fools and Horses (1989), Agatha Christie's Poirot (1992), Jeeves and Wooster (1993), The Upper Hand (1995), Wycliffe (1996), Dalziel and Pascoe (1999), Heartbeat (2000), Casualty (2002), Midsomer Murders (2003 and 2011), Doctors (2005 and 2009), Agatha Christie's Marple (2006), Holby City (2008 and 2015), Sherlock (2012) and Friday Night Dinner (2012, 2016, 2018, and 2020). From 1999 to 2001, she co-starred in the sitcom Gimme Gimme Gimme, playing a retired prostitute and featuring in the series with Kathy Burke and James Dreyfus.

Her other films include Prick Up Your Ears (1987) and About a Boy (2002). Throughout her career, Knight continued to work in the theatre, including with the Royal Shakespeare Company, the Royal Court Theatre and the Old Vic. She also worked at the Manchester Royal Exchange and the Crucible Theatre in Sheffield.

Personal life
Knight married theatre and television director Michael Elliott in July 1959; the couple remained married until his death in 1984. They had two daughters; Marianne Elliott, a theatre director, is married to actor Nick Sidi.

Death 
Knight died on 19 December 2020, at the age of 87.

Partial filmography

 Gone to Earth (1950) – Young Girl at Racecourse (uncredited)
 Richard III (1955) – Lady-in-Waiting (uncredited)
 Fortune Is a Woman (1957) (uncredited)
 Blue Murder at St Trinian's (1957) – Annabel
 The Horse's Mouth (1958) (uncredited)
 Carry On Nurse (1959) – Student Nurse Nightingale
 Carry On Teacher (1959) – Felicity Wheeler
 Doctor in Love (1960) – Doctor (uncredited)
 There Was a Crooked Man (1960) – Nurse
 The Kitchen (1961) – 17th Waitress
 Tom Jones (1963) – Mrs. Fitzpatrick
 Buddenbrooks (1965) – Pfiffi
 Jackanory (1966–1967) – Storyteller 
 Can Hieronymus Merkin Ever Forget Mercy Humppe and Find True Happiness? (1969) – Critic Penelope
 Start the Revolution Without Me (1970) – Helene de Sisi
 Eskimo Nell (1975) – Lady Longhorn
 Mister Quilp (1975) – Mrs. George
 The Lady Vanishes (1979) – Evelyn Barnes
 The Wildcats of St Trinian's (1980) – Miss Walsh
 Coronation Street (1981) – Mrs Ramsden
 Nancy Astor (1982, TV series) – Margot Asquith
 Prick Up Your Ears (1987) – RADA Judge
 Only Fools and Horses  (1989) – Mrs Creswell
 Afraid of the Dark (1991) – Edith
 The Blackheath Poisonings (1992, TV series) – Lady Reading Poetry
 Agatha Christie's Poirot (TV series, 1992) - Georgina Morley in "One, Two, Buckle My Shoe"
 Gunslinger's Revenge (1998) – Mrs Willow
 Tess of the D'Urbervilles (1998, TV movie) — Mrs D'Urberville
 Gimme Gimme Gimme (1999–2001) – Beryl 
 About a Boy (2002) – Lindsey's Mother
 Midsomer Murders (TV series, 2003) - Eleanor McPherson in "Birds of Prey"
 Agatha Christie's Marple (TV series, 2006) - Partridge in "The Moving Finger"
 Demons Never Die (2011) – Freida
 Midsomer Murders (TV series, 2011) - Mother Gerome in "A Sacred Trust"
 Friday Night Dinner (TV series, 2012, 2016, 2018, 2020) – Cynthia Goodman (also known as "Horrible Grandma")
 The Lady in the Van (2015) – Old Nun
 The Crown (2016, TV series) – Princess Alice of Battenberg

Selected theatre performances

 Mrs. Prentice in What the Butler Saw by Joe Orton. Directed by Braham Murray at the Royal Exchange, Manchester. (1977)
 Miss Erikson in Present Laughter by Noël Coward. Directed by James Maxwell at the Royal Exchange, Manchester.  (1977)
 Stepmother in Cinderella by Trevor Peacock. World Premiere directed by Anthony Bowles and Michele Hardy at the Royal Exchange, Manchester. (1979)
 Mrs. Rankling in The Schoolmistress by Arthur Wing Pinero. Directed by James Maxwell at the Royal Exchange, Manchester. (1979)
 Madam in Blood, Black and Gold by Gerard McLarnon. World premiere directed by Braham Murray at the Royal Exchange, Manchester. (1980)
 Mrs. Jike in Love on the Dole by Ronald Gow. Directed by Eric Thompson at the Royal Exchange, Manchester. (1980)
 Lady Windermere in Lord Arthur Saville's Crime by Oscar Wilde. Directed by Eric Thompson at the Royal Exchange, Manchester. (1982)
 Lady India in Ring Round the Moon by Jean Anouilh. Directed by Steven Pimlott at the Royal Exchange, Manchester. (1983)
 Mrs. Thorn in Class K by Trevor Peacock at the Royal Exchange, Manchester. (1985)
 Anya Pavlikov in Nude With Violin by Noël Coward. Directed by Marianne Elliott at the Royal Exchange, Manchester. (1999)

References

External links
 
 www.esmondknight.org.uk

1933 births
2020 deaths
Actresses from London
English film actresses
English television actresses
People from Marylebone
20th-century English actresses
21st-century English actresses
English stage actresses